The 1973–74 Seattle SuperSonics season was the 7th season of the Seattle SuperSonics in the National Basketball Association (NBA). Following the resignation of Lenny Wilkens as a head coach after the 1971–72 season and a poor campaign in the 1972–73 season that saw the departure of general manager Bob Houbregs, the Sonics hired Boston Celtics' stalwart Bill Russell as head coach and general manager. With Russell at the helm, the team finished in 6th place in the Western Conference with a 36–46 record. The Sonics' home court, Seattle Center Coliseum, was the venue for the 1974 NBA All-Star Game.

Offseason
The Sonics made only one trade during the offseason that sent All-Star Butch Beard to the Golden State Warriors and brought back a member of the original SuperSonics team, Walt Hazzard to Seattle.

Draft picks

Roster

Regular season

Season standings

Record vs. opponents

Game log

|-bgcolor=#fcc
| 1
| October 10
| @ Phoenix
| L 111–115
| Fred Brown (31)
| || ||Arizona Veterans Memorial Coliseum18,738
| 0–1

|-bgcolor=#cfc
| 2
| October 12
| Capital Bullets
| W 103–102
| Spencer Haywood (24)
| || ||Seattle Center Coliseum11,673
| 1–1 

|-bgcolor=#cfc
| 3
| October 14
| Milwaukee
| W 109–100
| Jim McDaniels (29)
| || ||Seattle Center Coliseum 11,240
| 2–1 

|-bgcolor=#fcc
| 4
| October 17
| Kansas City–Omaha
| L 106–108
| Spencer Haywood (31)
| || ||Seattle Center Coliseum9,618
| 2–2 

|-bgcolor=#fcc
| 5
| October 19
| @ Los Angeles
| L 91–118
| Jim Fox, Spencer Haywood (16)
| || ||The Forum 14,259
| 2–3 

|-bgcolor=#fcc
| 6
| October 20
| @ Portland
| L 108–123
| Dick Gibbs (25)
| || ||Memorial Coliseum 9,251
| 2–4 

|-bgcolor=#cfc
| 7
| October 21
| Phoenix
| W 116–112
| Fred Brown (24)
| || ||Seattle Center Coliseum 11,964
| 3–4

|-bgcolor=#fcc
| 8
| October 24
| Atlanta
| L 106–131
| Spencer Haywood (21)
| || ||Seattle Center Coliseum 9,626
| 3–5 

|-bgcolor=#fcc
| 9
| October 26
| Golden State
| L 110–117
| Dick Snyder (27)
| || ||Seattle Center Coliseum 10,906
| 3–6 

|-bgcolor=#fcc
| 10
| October 28
| Detroit
| L 93–115
| Spencer Haywood (22)
| || ||Seattle Center Coliseum 1,198
| 3–7

|-bgcolor=#fcc
| 11
| October 30
| @ Buffalo
| L 103–105
| Spencer Haywood (31)
| || ||Buffalo Memorial Auditorium 7,396
| 3–8

|-bgcolor=#fcc
| 12
| October 31
| @ Detroit
| L 107–114
| Fred Brown (31)
| || ||Cobo Arena 4,748
| 3–9

|-bgcolor=#cfc
| 13
| November 2
| @ Kansas City–Omaha
| W 115–109
| Fred Brown (37)
| || ||Municipal Auditorium 4,574
| 4–9

|-bgcolor=#fcc
| 14
| November 4
| New York
| L 106–111
| Spencer Haywood (34)
| || ||Seattle Center Coliseum 13,772
| 4–10

|-bgcolor=#cfc
| 15
| November 7
| Buffalo
| W 130–113
| Spencer Haywood (26)
| || ||Seattle Center Coliseum8,878
| 5–10

|-bgcolor=#fcc
| 16
| November 9
| Los Angeles
| L 111–118
| John Brisker (23)
| || ||Seattle Center Coliseum13,988
| 5–11

|-bgcolor=#fcc
| 17
| November 11
| Chicago
| L 98–116
| Spencer Haywood (25)
| || ||Seattle Center Coliseum10,915
| 5–12

|-bgcolor=#fcc
| 18
| November 13
| @ New York
| L 102–104
| Spencer Haywood (25)
| || ||Madison Square Garden17,478
| 5–13

|-bgcolor=#fcc
| 19
| November 14
| @ Boston
| L 104–110
| Fred Brown, Spencer Haywood (22)
| || ||Seattle Center Coliseum6,191
| 5–14

|-bgcolor=#cfc
| 20
| November 16
| Cleveland
| W 117–93
| Spencer Haywood (32)
| || ||Seattle Center Coliseum11,770
| 6–14

|-bgcolor=#cfc
| 21
| November 18
| Philadelphia
| W 95–91
| Spencer Haywood (31)
| || ||Seattle Center Coliseum10,900
| 7–14

|-bgcolor=#fcc
| 22
| November 22
| @ Portland
| L 125–131
| Spencer Haywood (28)
| || ||Memorial Coliseum7,285
| 7–15

|-bgcolor=#cfc
| 23
| November 23
| Portland
| W 127–106
| Spencer Haywood, Isaac Stallworth (23)
| || ||Seattle Center Coliseum 13,330
| 8–15

|-bgcolor=#cfc
| 24
| November 25
| @ Kansas City–Omaha
| W 104–99
| John Brisker (47)
| || ||Municipal Auditorium 4,213
| 9–15

|-bgcolor=#fcc
| 25
| November 27
| @ Cleveland
| L 118–120
| Spencer Haywood (34)
| || ||Cleveland Arena3,357
| 9–16

|-bgcolor=#fcc
| 26
| November 28
| @ Milwaukee
| L 93–127
| Isaac Stallworth (16)
| || ||Milwaukee Arena8,289
| 9–17

|-bgcolor=#fcc
| 27
| December 1
| @ Atlanta
| L 110–120
| Spencer Haywood (26)
| || ||Omni Coliseum7,194
| 9–18

|-bgcolor=#fcc
| 28
| December 2
| @ Capital Bullets
| L 96–98
| Slick Watts (24)
| || ||Capital Centre17,500
| 9–19

|-bgcolor=#fcc
| 29
| December 4
| @ Chicago
| L 107–130
| Fred Brown (24)
| || ||Chicago Stadium 5,104
| 9–20

|-bgcolor=#fcc
| 30
| December 6
| Detroit
| L 108–110
| Spencer Haywood (29)
| || ||Seattle Center Coliseum 7,758
| 9–21

|-bgcolor=#cfc
| 31
| December 7
| @ Los Angeles
| W 115–111
| Spencer Haywood (29)
| || ||The Forum 13,189
| 10–21

|-bgcolor=#fcc
| 32
| December 9
| Houston
| L 107–110
| Spencer Haywood, Slick Watts (18)
| || ||Seattle Center Coliseum 9,689
| 10–22

|-bgcolor=#fcc
| 33
| December 11
| @ Milwaukee
| L 91–130
| Fred Brown (23)
| || ||Milwaukee Arena 7,075
| 10–23

|-bgcolor=#cfc
| 34
| December 12
| @ Philadelphia
| W 100–93
| Dick Snyder (24)
| || ||The Spectrum 3,432
| 11–23

|-bgcolor=#cfc
| 35
| December 14
| Capital Bullets
| W 93–88
| Spencer Haywood (26)
| || ||Seattle Center Coliseum 11,857
| 12–23

|-bgcolor=#fcc
| 36
| December 16
| Phoenix
| L 109–113
| Spencer Haywood (28)
| || ||Seattle Center Coliseum 9,778
| 12–24

|-bgcolor=#cfc
| 37
| December 18
| @ Chicago
| W 93–92
| Spencer Haywood (23)
| || ||Chicago Stadium4,721
| 13–24

|-bgcolor=#cfc
| 38
| December 19
| @ Houston
| W 124–118 (OT)
| Spencer Haywood (37)
| || ||Hofheinz Pavilion2,371
| 14–24

|-bgcolor=#fcc
| 39
| December 21
| @ Cleveland
| L 96–101
| Dick Snyder (35)
| || ||Cleveland Arena2,173
| 14–25 

|-bgcolor=#fcc
| 40
| December 23
| Boston
| L 95–96
| Spencer Haywood (23)
| || ||Seattle Center Coliseum 13,970
| 14–26

|-bgcolor=#cfc
| 41
| December 26
| Los Angeles
| W 129–105
| Jim Fox (25)
| || ||Seattle Center Coliseum 12,755
| 15–26

|-bgcolor=#fcc
| 42
| December 27
| @ Phoenix
| L 100–111
| Dick Snyder (32)
| || ||Arizona Veterans Memorial Coliseum 7,555
| 15–27

|-bgcolor=#cfc
| 43
| December 28
| Portland
| W 110–93
| Spencer Haywood (26)
| || ||Seattle Center Coliseum 10,245
| 16–27

|-bgcolor=#cfc
| 44
| December 30
| Golden State
| W 96–92
| Jim Fox (29)
| || ||Seattle Center Coliseum 14,078
| 17–27

|-bgcolor=#fcc
| 45
| January 2
| Buffalo
| L 111–115
| Spencer Haywood (35)
| || ||Seattle Center Coliseum 12,011
| 17–28

|-bgcolor=#cfc
| 46
| January 4
| Chicago
| W 103–101 (OT)
| Spencer Haywood (31)
| || ||Seattle Center Coliseum 12,042
| 18–28

|-bgcolor=#cfc
| 47
| January 6
| Houston
| W 91–90
| Spencer Haywood (34)
| || ||Seattle Center Coliseum 12,184
| 19–28

|-bgcolor=#cfc
| 48
| January 9
| Kansas City–Omaha
| W 100–96
| Dick Snyder (25)
| || ||Seattle Center Coliseum 10,048
| 20–28

|-bgcolor=#fcc
| 49
| January 10
| @ Golden State
| L 89–125
| Jim Fox (15)
| || ||Oakland–Alameda County Coliseum Arena 3,032
| 20–29

|-bgcolor=#fcc
| 50
| January 11
| New York
| L 98–107
| Dick Snyder (29)
| || ||Seattle Center Coliseum 14,078
| 20–30

|-bgcolor=#cfc
| 51
| January 13
| @ Phoenix
| W 123–112
| Fred Brown (38)
| || ||Arizona Veterans Memorial Coliseum 5,769
| 21–30

|-bgcolor=#cfc
| 52
| January 18
| @ Philadelphia
| W 116–104
| Spencer Haywood (25)
| || ||The Spectrum 3,108
| 22–30

|-bgcolor=#fcc
| 53
| January 19
| @ Atlanta
| L 109–127
| Dick Snyder (41)
| || ||Omni Coliseum 6,938
| 22–31

|-bgcolor=#cfc
| 54
| January 23
| @ Boston
| W 98–97
| Fred Brown (26)
| || ||Boston Garden 6,237
| 23–31

|-bgcolor=#fcc
| 55
| January 25
| @ Chicago
| L 99–104
| Spencer Haywood (33)
| || ||Chicago Stadium 9,422
| 23–32

|-bgcolor=#fcc
| 56
| January 26
| @ Detroit
| L 83–94
| Dick Snyder (18)
| || ||Cobo Arena 8,386
| 23–33

|-bgcolor=#cfc
| 57
| January 29
| @ Houston
| W 115–107
| Spencer Haywood (32)
| || ||Hofheinz Pavilion 3,027
| 24–33

|-bgcolor=#cfc
| 58
| February 1
| Milwaukee
| W 110–85
| Dick Snyder (24)
| || ||Seattle Center Coliseum 14,017
| 25–33

|-bgcolor=#fcc
| 59
| February 2
| @ Portland
| L 97–102
| Spencer Haywood (25)
| || ||Memorial Coliseum 7,526
| 25–34

|-bgcolor=#fcc
| 60
| February 3
| Detroit
| L 100–114
| Spencer Haywood, Dick Snyder (24)
| || ||Seattle Center Coliseum14,078
| 25–35

|-bgcolor=#fcc
| 61
| February 5
| @ Golden State
| L 113–129
| Jim Fox, Spencer Haywood (24)
| || ||Oakland–Alameda County Coliseum Arena 4,197
| 25–36

|-bgcolor=#cfc
| 62
| February 6
| Portland
| W 107–94
| Dick Gibbs (30)
| || ||Seattle Center Coliseum 11,204
| 26–36

|-bgcolor=#cfc
| 63
| February 10
| Kansas City–Omaha
| W 119–103
| Spencer Haywood (24)
| || ||Seattle Center Coliseum 13,608
| 27–36

|-bgcolor=#cfc
| 64
| February 13
| Boston
| W 118–100
| Dick Snyder (31)
| || ||Seattle Center Coliseum 12,031
| 28–36

|-bgcolor=#fcc
| 65
| February 15
| @ Los Angeles
| L 96–112
| Dick Snyder (22)
| || ||The Forum 15,263
| 28–37

|-bgcolor=#cfc
| 66
| February 17
| Cleveland
| W 106–97
| Fred Brown (24)
| || ||Seattle Center Coliseum 14,078
| 29–37

|-bgcolor=#fcc
| 67
| February 23
| Los Angeles
| L 116–118
| Spencer Haywood (32)
| || ||Seattle Center Coliseum 14,078
| 29–38

|-bgcolor=#cfc
| 68
| February 24
| Philadelphia
| W 115–105
| Spencer Haywood (37)
| || ||Seattle Center Coliseum 13,779
| 30–38

|-bgcolor=#fcc
| 69
| February 27
| @ Capital Bullets
| L 100–104
| Fred Brown (28)
| || ||Capital Centre 5,140
| 30–39

|-bgcolor=#cfc
| 70
| March 1
| @ Detroit
| W 105–103
| Spencer Haywood (16)
| || ||Cobo Arena 6,694
| 31–39

|-bgcolor=#fcc
| 71
| March 2
| @ Milwaukee
| L 99–116
| Dick Snyder (25)
| || ||Milwaukee Arena 10,938
| 31–40

|-bgcolor=#fcc
| 72
| March 5
| @ New York
| L 106–111
| Spencer Haywood (27)
| || ||Madison Square Garden 19,964
| 31–41

|-bgcolor=#cfc
| 73
| March 8
| @ Buffalo
| W 123–117 (OT)
| Spencer Haywood (31)
| || ||Buffalo Memorial Auditorium 16,218
| 32–41

|-bgcolor=#fcc
| 74
| March 9
| @ Kansas City–Omaha
| L 96–106
| Dick Gibbs (25)
| || ||Omaha Civic Auditorium 3,870
| 32–42

|-bgcolor=#fcc
| 75
| March 15
| Atlanta
| L 107–126
| Fred Brown (26)
| || ||Seattle Center Coliseum 14,078
| 32–43

|-bgcolor=#fcc
| 76
| March 17
| Phoenix
| L 108–133
| Dick Snyder (28)
| || ||Seattle Center Coliseum 13,007
| 32–44

|-bgcolor=#cfc
| 77
| March 20
| Golden State
| W 110–107
| Dick Snyder (30)
| || ||Seattle Center Coliseum 10,657
| 33–44

|-bgcolor=#fcc
| 78
| March 22
| Milwaukee
| L 101–106
| Dick Snyder (28)
| || ||Seattle Center Coliseum 13,771
| 33–45

|-bgcolor=#cfc
| 79
| March 23
| @ Golden State
| W 139–137
| Fred Brown (58)
| || ||Oakland–Alameda County Coliseum Arena 7,570
| 34–45

|-bgcolor=#fcc
| 80
| March 24
| Chicago
| L 113–122
| Fred Brown (29)
| || ||Seattle Center Coliseum 12,430
| 34–46

|-bgcolor=#cfc
| 81
| March 26
| @ Los Angeles
| W 121–115
| Fred Brown (37)
| || ||The Forum 13,489
| 35–46

|-bgcolor=#cfc
| 82
| March 27
| Phoenix
| W 127–123
| Fred Brown (34)
| || ||Seattle Center Coliseum 12,528
| 36–46

Player statistics

Awards and records
 Spencer Haywood was selected to the All-NBA Second Team and represented the West in the 1974 NBA All-Star Game.

Transactions

Overview

Trades

References

Seattle
Seattle SuperSonics seasons